Pan Bing (Chinese: 潘兵; born February 13, 1970, in Hubei) is a Chinese tennis player. He won 1990 and 1994 Men's singles gold medal in Asian Games, making him the only tennis player who could win singles gold medal twice.

See also
Tennis in China

External links
 

1970 births
Living people
Chinese male tennis players
Asian Games medalists in tennis
Tennis players at the 1990 Asian Games
Tennis players at the 1994 Asian Games
Tennis players from Hubei
Medalists at the 1990 Asian Games
Medalists at the 1994 Asian Games
Asian Games gold medalists for China
Asian Games silver medalists for China
Asian Games bronze medalists for China
20th-century Chinese people